Rutland Township, Illinois may refer to one of the following townships:

 Rutland Township, Kane County, Illinois
 Rutland Township, LaSalle County, Illinois

See also

Rutland Township (disambiguation)

Illinois township disambiguation pages